Yu Zaiqing (Simplified Chinese:, born 26 April 1951) is a Chinese sports administrator, a member of the executive board of the International Olympic Committee (IOC) since 2000, and a vice-president from 2008 to 2012, and since February 2014.

He has a bachelor's degree from Nankai University.

References

1951 births
Living people
Chinese Basketball Association executives
Chinese referees and umpires
International Olympic Committee members
Sportspeople from Harbin